The 2014 Hell in a Cell was the sixth annual Hell in a Cell professional wrestling pay-per-view and livestreaming event produced by WWE. It took place on October 26, 2014, at the American Airlines Center in Dallas, Texas, and was the second Hell in a Cell to be held at this venue after the 2010 event. This was the first Hell in a Cell event to air on the WWE Network, which launched in February.

Eight matches were contested on the main card while one match took place on the Kickoff pre-show, which was streamed live on the WWE Network. The card featured two Hell in a Cell matches, where John Cena defeated Randy Orton to secure a future WWE World Heavyweight Championship match, and, in the main event, Seth Rollins defeated Dean Ambrose.

The event had 83,000 buys (excluding WWE Network views), down from the previous year's 228,000 buys.

Production

Background 
Hell in a Cell is a gimmick pay-per-view (PPV) event produced annually in October by WWE since 2009. The concept of the show comes from WWE's established Hell in a Cell match, in which competitors fight inside a 20-foot-high roofed cell structure surrounding the ring and ringside area. The main event match of the card is contested under the Hell in a Cell stipulation. The 2014 event was the sixth event under the Hell in a Cell chronology and was held on October 26 at the American Airlines Center in Dallas, Texas, marking the second Hell in a Cell to be held at this venue after the 2010 event. In addition to traditional PPV, it was the first Hell in a Cell to be broadcast on WWE's online streaming service, the WWE Network, which launched in February.

Storylines 
The card consisted of nine matches, including one on the Kickoff pre-show, that resulted from scripted storylines, where wrestlers portrayed villains, heroes, or less distinguishable characters in scripted events that built tension and culminated in a wrestling match or series of matches, with results predetermined by WWE's writers. Storylines between the characters played out on WWE's primary television programs, Raw and SmackDown.

At Night of Champions, Dean Ambrose returned to WWE after a one-month hiatus, attacking Seth Rollins. Later that night, John Cena defeated Brock Lesnar by disqualification for the WWE World Heavyweight Championship when Rollins attacked Cena. Rollins then attempted to cash in his Money in the Bank contract on Lesnar, but was stopped by Cena. On the September 29 episode of Raw, Cena and Ambrose defeated Kane and Randy Orton by disqualification after Rollins attacked Ambrose. On the October 6 edition of Raw, Cena defeated Rollins, Orton and Kane by disqualification in a handicap match. Triple H then announced that Cena would face Ambrose at the pay-per-view, with the winner facing Rollins later in the night in a Hell in a Cell match. On the October 10 edition of SmackDown, during the Miz TV segment, it was announced by The Miz that the match will be a No Holds Barred Contract on a Pole match. On the October 13 episode of Raw, Triple H announced that the Cena–Ambrose match would take place on Raw in the main event and the winner would face Rollins. Later in the show, Orton was granted by Triple H a match against the loser of the Contract on a Pole match, also taking place in a Hell in a Cell match at the event. Ambrose went on to win the match against Cena, thus setting up Ambrose vs. Rollins and Cena vs. Orton. On the October 20 episode of Raw,  Triple H announced that the match between Cena and Orton would be a number one contender match for the WWE World Heavyweight Title.

At Night of Champions, AJ Lee defeated Paige to win the Divas Championship in a triple threat match that also included Nikki Bella. On the September 29 edition of Raw, Paige and Alicia Fox attacked AJ after Fox defeated AJ On the October 6 edition of Raw, Paige and Fox defeated AJ and Emma. On the October 10 edition of SmackDown, AJ defeated Fox, after which AJ and Paige attacked each other. On the October 13 edition of Raw, AJ and Layla defeated Paige and Fox. On the October 17 edition of SmackDown, AJ defeated Layla, after which Paige attacked AJ On October 20, it was announced on WWE.com that AJ would defend the title against Paige at Hell in a Cell.

At SummerSlam, Nikki Bella turned heel and attacked Brie Bella during her match against Stephanie McMahon, costing Brie the match in the process. On the October 13 episode of Raw, during a WWE.com exclusive, Nikki interrupted Brie's interview with the news that they will face off at the event, concluding that the loser of the match would become the winner's personal assistant for one month. However, if the loser fails to perform those duties, she will be terminated from the WWE.

Since losing the Intercontinental Championship back to Dolph Ziggler, The Miz began feuding with United States Champion Sheamus after several tag matches with his "stunt double" "Damien Mizdow" against Sheamus and Ziggler. On the October 6 edition of Raw, The Miz defeated Sheamus due to interference by Damien Mizdow. On the October 13 edition of Raw, The Miz defeated Sheamus via count–out. On October 14, WWE.com announced that Sheamus would defend the title against Miz at the event.

On the September 26 edition of SmackDown, Big Show defeated Rusev by disqualification after Rusev hit Big Show with a Russian flag. On the September 29 edition of Raw, Big Show attacked Rusev and tore down a Russian flag. On the October 3 edition of Smackdown, Rusev attacked Big Show. On the October 13 edition of Raw, Rusev defeated Big Show by disqualification after Mark Henry attacked Rusev. On October 14, WWE.com announced that Big Show would face Rusev at Hell in a Cell.

At Night of Champions, Gold and Stardust defeated The Usos to win the WWE Tag Team Championship. On the September 26 edition of SmackDown, The Usos defeated Gold and Stardust via disqualification in a rematch for the tag title. In the following weeks, the two teams clashed in six-man tag team matches, which The Usos won. On October 20, it was announced on WWE.com that Gold and Stardust would defend the title against The Usos at Hell in a Cell.

On the September 22 edition of Raw, Dolph Ziggler defeated The Miz to win the Intercontinental Championship. On the September 26 episode of SmackDown, Cesaro won a battle royal to face Ziggler for the title later in the night. Later in the night, Ziggler defeated Cesaro, but Cesaro was holding the bottom rope and the referee didn't see it. On the September 29 edition of Raw, Ziggler successfully defended the title in a triple threat match against The Miz and Cesaro. On the October 20 episode of Raw, Cesaro defeated Ziggler in a non-title match. On the October 24 episode of Smackdown, Ziggler successfully defended the title against Cesaro. Later in the night, it was announced that Ziggler would defend the title against Cesaro in a 2-out-of-3 falls match at the event.

The Kickoff pre-show featured a special broadcast of "Mizdow TV" with The Miz as the special guest.

Event

Pre-show 
The analysis team was hosted by Renee Young and consisted of Alex Riley, Booker T, and special guest Paul Heyman.

The Hell in a Cell Kickoff pre-show featured a segment of "Mizdow TV", hosted by Damien Mizdow with The Miz as the special guest. Mizdow asked Miz what are his chances of winning the WWE United States Championship later in the night. Sheamus appeared on the TitanTron and said that Miz would suffer a Brogue Kick instead.

Later, Mark Henry faced Bo Dallas. Henry executed a World's Strongest Slam on Dallas to win the match.

Preliminary matches
The actual pay-per-view opened with Dolph Ziggler defending the Intercontinental Championship against Cesaro in a two out of three falls match. Ziggler won the first fall by pinning Cesaro with a roll-up. Cesaro executed a Pop Up European Uppercut on Ziggler for a nearfall, while Ziggler executed a Famouser for another nearfall. Ziggler won the match after executing a Zig-Zag on Cesaro, winning the match 2 falls to 0 and retaining the title.

Next, Nikki Bella faced Brie Bella. Nikki executed a Rack Attack on Brie for a near-fall. Brie applied the Yes! Lock on Nikki, who reached the ropes. Nikki executed a second Rack Attack to win the match, making Brie her personal assistant for 30 days.

After that, Gold and Stardust defended the Tag Team Championship against The Usos. Goldust executed a Final Cut on Jey Uso to win the match for his team.

In the fourth match, John Cena faced Randy Orton for a future shot at the WWE World Heavyweight Championship in a Hell in a Cell match, the second time the two had faced off inside the structure at the event after the 2009 show. During the match, Orton executed an RKO on Cena for a near-fall. As Orton and Cena traded counters, Orton attacked Cena with a low-blow for a near-fall. Cena applied the STF but Orton escaped. Cena finally executed an Attitude Adjustment for a near-fall. Cena attempted another Attitude Adjustment but Orton countered into another RKO for a near-fall. Cena executed another Attitude Adjustment for a near-fall. Cena won the match after he executed a Super Attitude Adjustment through a table.

Next, Sheamus defended the United States Championship against The Miz. Damien Mizdow mimicked attacks and defenses throughout the match. The Miz executed a Skull Crushing Finale for a near-fall. Sheamus won the match after executing a Brogue Kick.

After that, Big Show faced Rusev. Rusev forced Big Show to submit to The Accolade to win the match.

In the penultimate match, AJ Lee defended the Divas Championship against Paige. AJ forced Paige to submit to the Black Widow to win the match.

Main event
In the main event, Dean Ambrose faced Seth Rollins in a Hell in a Cell match. Ambrose climbed the cell before the match began, and Jamie Noble and Joey Mercury emerged and tried to coax him down. Mercury and Noble climbed the cell but Ambrose attacked them with a kendo stick, allowing Rollins to climb the cell and attack Ambrose. Both attacked each other until they fell off the side of the cage and through the announce tables (similar to Mick Foley's famous 1998 incident). Both were placed onto stretchers until Ambrose recovered and attacked Rollins. The match officially started when both participants entered the cell. Ambrose sat on a chair while taunting Rollins and berating him for his betrayal. Ambrose performed a Diving Elbow Drop through a table on Rollins. Ambrose attempted to put Rollins through cinder blocks but Rollins avoided it. Kane sprayed a fire extinguisher at Ambrose through the cell, allowing Rollins to perform a Powerbomb through a table on Ambrose. Rollins executed a Curb Stomp on Ambrose for a near-fall. As Ambrose attempted a Curb Stomp on Rollins, the arena lights cut out and Bray Wyatt's lantern appeared in the middle of the ring, spraying out smoke and projecting an image of a ghostly specter while Wyatt was heard reciting an incantation. Wyatt emerged from the smoke and executed a Uranage Slam on Ambrose, who was then pinned by Rollins for the victory. After the match, Wyatt executed a Sister Abigail on Ambrose and laughed maniacally until the show ended.

Reception
The event received generally positive reviews. James Caldwell of the Pro Wrestling Torch rated the Bella match and the Divas championship match between AJ Lee and Paige with 2 stars each, saying that Brie Bella's loss "[made] the babyface seem weak", while calling the Divas championship match a "solid match", but at the same time asking "Now, where do they go with A.J. and Paige after putting an end to their game of hot potato with the title?", referring to the title changes that the two exchanged at SummerSlam and Night of Champions. Caldwell didn't rate the Rollins vs. Ambrose match, stating that it was a "chaotic match fitting the feud", but with "a questionable TV-style finish to a main event.

Aftermath
The next night on Raw, Big Show and Mark Henry faced Gold and Stardust for the WWE Tag Team Championships. Henry turned heel when an argument ensued between him and Show when he executed the World's Strongest Slam on Show, thus costing themselves the match. After the match, Henry executed three World's Strongest Slams on Show. On the November 3 edition of Raw, Henry and Show faced each other which Show won by disqualification after getting hit with a chair. The two continued the feud as both of them were on opposing teams of Team Cena/Team Authority at Survivor Series (Show on Team Cena, Henry on Team Authority) 

Randy Orton, who was Curb Stomped by Seth Rollins on the Raw prior to Hell in a Cell, managed to get his retribution the next week. Orton turned face after he attacked Rollins with an RKO. In the process, he was no longer associated with the villainous stable The Authority. On the November 3 edition of Raw. Orton lost to Rollins in the main event. Orton was eventually attacked by fellow Authority member Kane, injuring him (Kayfabe) and leaving to bleed. This was done so Orton could take leave to begin production on The Condemned 2: Desert Prey.

Meanwhile, due to The Authority unhappy following John Cena's win to earn another shot at the WWE World Heavyweight Championship, Triple H challenged a team captained by Cena (including himself) to a traditional Survivor Series elimination match against The Authority. Later that night, Cena faced Rollins in the main event. Cena won by disqualification after Kane got involved. This triggered a massive brawl involving the entire locker room. Cena still stood tall at the end of the night.

Results

References

External links

2014
2014 WWE Network events
2014 in Texas
Events in Dallas
Professional wrestling in the Dallas–Fort Worth metroplex
2014 WWE pay-per-view events
October 2014 events in the United States